Cognitive Systems Research is a scientific journal that covers all topics in the study of cognitive science, both natural and artificial cognitive systems. Its founding editors-in-chief were Ron Sun, Vasant Honavar, and Gregg Oden (from 1999 to 2014). It is published by Elsevier.  The journal publishes 4 issues a year and is abstracted and indexed in Scopus and the Science Citation Index. According to the Journal Citation Reports, its 2020 impact factor is 3.523. The current co-editor-in-chiefs are Serge Thill and Mog Stapleton.

External links
 journal web page

References

Cognitive science journals
Computer science journals
Elsevier academic journals
Cognitive science
Publications established in 1999